Plegapteryx is a genus of moths in the family Geometridae erected by Gottlieb August Wilhelm Herrich-Schäffer in 1856.

Species
Plegapteryx anomalus Herrich-Schäffer, [1856]
Plegapteryx hellingsi Carcasson, 1962
Plegapteryx obscura Holland, 1893
Plegapteryx peregrinus Carcasson, 1962
Plegapteryx prouti Bethune-Baker, 1927
Plegapteryx purpurascens Holland, 1893
Plegapteryx sphingata Warren, 1895
Plegapteryx subsplendens Holland, 1893

References

Geometridae